Elizabeth Hadly (born 1958) is a professor in the Department of Biology at Stanford University, and holds the Paul S. and Billie Achilles Chair of Environmental Science. Her research interests include links between ecology and evolution, and understanding of the impacts of the Anthropocene.

Career
Hadly studied anthropology at University of Colorado Boulder. She then studied for a masters in quaternary science at Northern Arizona University in Flagstaff. Her PhD research in integrative biology was awarded by the University of California, Berkeley.

In September 2016, Hadly became faculty director for the Stanford Jasper Ridge Biological Preserve.

Since 2018, she has also been a professor at the Howard Hughes Medical Institute.

Research
Hadly has numerous published scholarly papers. With Anthony Barnosky and others, she co-authored a 2012 Nature paper on climatic 'tipping points' and is also co-author, with Barnosky, of Tipping Point for Planet Earth, How Close Are We to the Edge? (2016). She and Barnosky appeared in the 2015 documentary film, Tomorrow.

References 

1958 births
Living people
University of Colorado Boulder alumni
Northern Arizona University alumni
University of California, Berkeley alumni
Stanford University faculty
American women biologists
21st-century American women